Garmab-e Mohammad Rezavandi (also Romanized as Garmāb-e Moḩammad Rez̤āvandī) is a village in Gowavar Rural District, Govar District, Gilan-e Gharb County, Kermanshah Province, Iran. At the 2006 census, its population was 210, in 48 families.

References 

Populated places in Gilan-e Gharb County